Hans Gustaf Nyström (born 23 August 1960) is a Swedish windsurfer. He competed in the Windglider event at the 1984 Summer Olympics, finishing in 10th place.

References

External links
 
 

1960 births
Living people
Swedish windsurfers
Swedish male sailors (sport)
Olympic sailors of Sweden
Sailors at the 1984 Summer Olympics – Windglider
Sportspeople from Stockholm
20th-century Swedish people